The 2015 City of Jesolo Trophy was the eighth edition of the City of Jesolo Trophy competition and was held March 25–29, 2015 at the SGA Gymnasium Treviso in Jesolo, Italy Teams from Italy, the United States, Canada, Australia and France competed at the event.

Medal table

Medalists

Results

Seniors

Team

All-around

Vault

Uneven bars

Balance beam

Floor exercise

Juniors

Team

All-around

Vault

Uneven bars

Balance beam

Floor exercise

Participants 
Gymnasts from Italy, the United States, Canada, Australia and France attended the event.



Senior team 
 Alyssa Baumann
 Simone Biles
 Madison Desch
 Gabrielle Douglas
 Bailie Key
 Maggie Nichols
 Alexandra Raisman
 Kyla Ross
 Emily Schild
 Megan Skaggs

Junior team
 Norah Flatley
 Jazmyn Foberg
 Laurie Hernandez
 Victoria Nguyen
 Ragan Smith
 Olivia Trautman



Senior team 
 Erika Fasana
 Carlotta Ferlito
 Alessia Leolini
 Elisa Meneghini
 Martina Rizzelli
 Tea Ugrin

Junior team
 Sofia Arosio
 Sara Berardinelli
 Clara Colombo
 Francesca Linari
 Michela Redemagni
 Nicole Simionato

Young Dreams (Italy)
 Alice D’Amato	
 Asia D’Amato	
 Giorgia Villa



Senior team 
 Ellie Black
 Helody Cyrenne	
 Sabrina Gill	
 Isabela Onyshko	
 Audrey Rousseau	
 Sydney Townsend	
 Victoria-Kayen Woo

Junior team
 Jade Chrobok	
 Shallon Olsen	
 Ana Padurariu	
 Megan Roberts	
 Meaghan Ruttan	
 Rose-Kaying Woo



Senior team 
 Camille Bahl
 Marine Brevet	
 Loan His	
 Anne Kuhm	
 Valentine Pikul	
 Louise Vanhille



Senior team 
 Eliza Freeman	
 Georgia Godwin
 Emily Little
 Rianna Mizzen
 Kiara Munteanu
 Emma Nedov

Junior team 
 Yasmin Collier	
 Talia Folino
 Paige James
 Emi Watterson
 Emily Whitehead

References 

2015 in gymnastics
City of Jesolo Trophy
2015 in Italian sport
International gymnastics competitions hosted by Italy